Edward Cadogan (1880–1962) was a British politician.

Edward Cadogan may also refer to:

Edward Cadogan (rower) (1833–1890), British clergyman and rower who won Silver Goblets at Henley Royal Regatta
Edward Cadogan (cricketer) (1908–1993), English cricketer